Aloglutamol is an antacid, an aluminium compound.  It is a salt of aluminium, gluconic acid, and tris. It is usually given orally in doses of 0.5 to 1 g. Proprietary names include Altris, Pyreses, Tasto and Sabro.

References

Antacids
Gluconates
Aluminium compounds